Sarcelles is a commune in the northern suburbs of Paris, France. Sarcelles is a sub-prefecture of the Val-d'Oise department and the seat of the arrondissement of Sarcelles.

In the south of the commune, during the 1950s and 1960s, vast housing estates were built in order to accommodate pieds-noirs (French settlers from Algeria) and Jews who had left Algeria due to its war of independence. A few Jews from Egypt settled there after the Suez crisis, and Jews from Tunisia and Morocco settled in Sarcelles after unrest and riots against Jews due to the Six-Day War and to the Yom Kippur War.

Transport
Sarcelles is served by Garges–Sarcelles station on Paris RER line D.

It is also served by Sarcelles–Saint-Brice station on the Transilien Paris-Nord suburban rail line. This station, although administratively located on the territory of the neighbouring commune of Saint-Brice-sous-Forêt, lies in fact very near the town centre of Sarcelles.

Population

 the commune has about 40,000 residents from 40 backgrounds.

Immigration
A substantial number of inhabitants of the town are pieds-noirs from Northwest Africa who immigrated to France in the 1960s. Sarcelles is also home to a vibrant Jewish community and the largest concentration of Assyrians in France.

Rahsaan Maxwell, author of Ethnic Minority Migrants in Britain and France: Integration Trade-Offs, stated that compared with other French communities, the ethnic minorities in Sarcelles have more influence, so therefore "Sarcelles should not be considered representative of cities across metropolitan France". Residents believe that there is a "Sarcelles identity," meaning any ethnic group can be a part of the city, and they believe it lowers levels of crime and violence.

Compared with other parts of France, ethnic minorities in Sarcelles gained political power at a faster rate, with gains made in the 1980s instead of the 1990s and 2000s. Many politicians responded to minority demands sooner as many immigrants, especially Caribbeans and Sephardic Jews, had French citizenship. François Pupponi, the mayor in the 2000s dedicated monuments commemorating the histories of ethnic groups, authorised funding of organisations supporting specific ethnic groups such as running Arabic and Hindi language classes and permitted the use of public facilities for religious events. Pupponi argued that this style is the best method of giving many ethnic groups one sense of community. Critics argued that funding groups catering to specific ethnic groups promotes segregation.

Caribbeans
, 8.7% of the population was of Caribbean origin. , many of the ethnic Caribbean residents have French citizenship.

By the 1970s, Afro-Caribbeans became more interested in changing politics. By the 1980s, Guy Guyoubli, a local activist, organised an almost all-Caribbean protest list. Maxwell wrote that this demonstrated that Caribbeans had serious intentions of participating in the political system, even though there were no representatives elected from the lists. At the time, ethnic minorities across Metropolitan France were increasingly trying to influence the political system. The city's first ever two Caribbean councillors were elected in 1989. Around 1989, Raymond Lamontagne, the mayor, opened Metropolitan France's first ever Caribbean-orientated, council-funded community centre.

Maghrebian Muslims

In the 1950s and 1960s, Maghrebians began to arrive in Sarcelles. Political organisation came in subsequent decades. Originally, the Muslims worshipped in converted makeshift areas, but, later, purpose-built mosques appeared. In the 1990s, Maghrebians were first elected to the commune council. Maxwell wrote that Maghrebians began obtaining "key positions" only in the vicinity of 2012 due to "low turnout and weak community organisations".

Assyrian and Chaldean

A memorial to Assyro-Chaldean victims of the 1915 Assyrian genocide was dedicated in 2005. Part of the film The Last Assyrians features the Assyrian and Chaldean  community.

Sephardic Jews
Sarcelles gained a large population of Sephardic Jews as a consequence of the post-World War II Jewish exodus from Arab and Muslim countries. Today, most of the Jewish residents have French citizenship.

During the peak immigration of Sephardic Jews, they subscribed to a belief in assimilation and secularism and they had the North African belief of what Michel Wieviorka and Philippe Bataille, authors of The Lure of Anti-Semitism: Hatred of Jews in Present-Day France, describe as "a structuring role" that "does not cover all aspects of social life". Beginning in the 1980s, religion became more public and important, and Wieviorka and Bataille stated that the previous North African practice is "becoming mixed up with the neo-Orthodox practices of the 'young people' for whom religion controls everything."

In 1983, there was a wave of councillors who were Sephardic Jews.

Crime

In 2012, Maxwell stated that "petty crime" and vandalism had become consistent issues and that "violent confrontations" between black migrants, Maghrebians and Jews was "a recurring theme". He added that, by 2012, the commune had "developed a reputation as one of the more dangerous Paris suburbs." Maxwell wrote that local residents told him that the reputation was overblown.

Maxwell wrote that, during the 2005 French riots, a report concluded that the damage to buildings in Sarcelles was "relatively moderate" and that a later report concluded that, compared with most cities, Sarcelles had fewer days of severe riots. He also stated that local residents characterised the damage as "not as bad as elsewhere and not as bad as one might have expected given Sarcelles's economic and ethnic profile."

International relations

Twin towns – sister cities
Sarcelles is twinned with:
 Netanya, Israel, since 1988
 Hattersheim, Germany, since 1987

Co-operation agreement
 Martakert, Nagorno-Karabakh Republic, since 2015

Education
The commune has 19 public écoles maternelles (pre-schools/nurseries), 21 public écoles primaires (primary schools), six public collèges (junior high schools), two public lycées (senior high schools/sixth-form colleges), and two other educational institutions. 
 Collèges:  Chantereine, Anatole-France, Évariste-Galois, Jean-Lurçat, Victor Hugo, and Voltaire
 Lycées: Lycée Polyvalent de La Tourelle and Lycée Polyvalent J.J. Rousseau
 Others: I.U.T (Institut universitaire de technologie), C.I.O (Centre d'information et d'orientation)

The Bibliothèque intercommunale Anna Langfus is located in Sarcelles. This library has over 60,000 items and is divided between an adults' section and a children's section. In addition the Espace Musique Mel Bonis is in Sarcelles.

Notable people
Les Twins, New Style dancers
Jonathan Assous, footballer
Damien Cely, diver
Sarah Cysique, judoka
Mohamed Dia, fashion designer
Didier Domi, footballer
Andy Faustin, footballer
Mathys Tel, footballer
Dimitri Foulquier, footballer
Eric Sabin, footballer
Derek Mazou-Sacko, footballer
Younousse Sankhare, footballer
Jean-Manuel Thetis, footballer
Frederic Thomas, footballer
Jonathan Tokple, footballer
Steeve Yago, footballer
Riyad Mahrez, footballer
Wissam Ben Yedder, footballer
Amir Haddad, singer
Miss Dominique, singer
Dominique Strauss-Kahn, former mayor of Sarcelles

See also
 Ministère AMER
 Passi
 Stomy Bugsy
Communes of the Val-d'Oise department

Notes

References
Maxwell, Rahsaan. Ethnic Minority Migrants in Britain and France: Integration Trade-Offs. Cambridge University Press, 5 March 2012. , 9781107378032.

 Mulvey, M. (2016) “The Problem that Had a Name: French High-Rise Developments and the Fantasy of a Suburban Homemaker Pathology, 1954–73,” Gender & History, 28, no.1, pp. 179–200. https://onlinelibrary.wiley.com/doi/abs/10.1111/1468-0424.12182

External links

Official website 

Association of Mayors of the Val d'Oise 

Communes of Val-d'Oise
Jews and Judaism in France
Subprefectures in France